Stuck Out were an Australian rock band from Melbourne, formed in 2015. The band's final line-up consisted of guitarist Ian Browney, bassist Sheldon Schuyler, drummer Lachy Lydiard, and vocalist Joshua Walker. The band released two extended plays: You Won't Come Home (2018) and Lie Through Your Teeth  (2020), before breaking up in 2022 without ever releasing a studio album.

History

Formation and early years (2015–2017)
Stuck Out was formed in 2015 in Melbourne by Ian Browney on lead guitar, Bren Dugan on rhythm guitar, Lachy Lydiard on drums, and Josh Walker on bass and vocals. The four were school friends, and after graduating they decided to make the band legitimate. In 2015 through their Bandcamp site the band released an acoustic single "Homebound" and subsequently backed this up with the 2-track "Head Above Water", and later a stand-alone single "Statelines". In April 2016, Jackson Cairnduff joined the band on bass guitar. Later the same year the band released a 3-track titled "What We've Come To Be", from which they gathered a modest fanbase. Ahead of the band's next release, they amicably parted ways with bassist Jackson Cairnduff and shortly after Sheldon Schuyler, a school friend of the band, was added to fill the vacant position.

You Won't Come Home and Dugan's departure (2018–2019)
In January 2018 the 5 piece signed onto Greyscale Records, the band later then worked under the label to create their debut EP You Won't Come Home, it was released on the band's new Bandcamp site a month later. Chris Vernon of Belle Haven helped record the album. The track "Self Doubt" features guest vocals from Jake Wilson from fellow local act Between You And Me. Vocalist Josh Walker described their new EP as being the start of a new progression, "progression of sound, progression of story and progression of the band." On 10 April, a music video for their single "Stitch" was released. In May, Stuck Out performed their EP to a sold-out crowd at the Workers Club in Fitzroy, Victoria. On 14 October, they released "Linger (Stripped Back)", an acoustic cover of their track "Linger", it was uploaded alongside a music video. Later that year, in December, Stuck Out joined the lineup for the inaugural Good Things festival in Melbourne as a local support band, becoming the first band to ever play at Good Things Festival.

On 7 February 2019, Stuck Out released their new single entitled "Everything You Wanted" along with an accompanying music video. Walker based the lyrics on his personal experiences of feeling lost and confused through different relations with people, he said: "We really tried to encapsulate sincerity in this new single. It’s that feeling of not being good enough for the person you feel is too good for you and not quite knowing how to fix yourself." Kel Burch from Depth criticised the single saying that they "[felt] like it may be time for Stuck Out to push the limits a little more." On 5 May, Stuck Out announced that long-time rhythm guitarist Bren Dugan will leave the band to focus on other life ambitions, he played two final shows with the band later in the month before officially leaving.

Lie Through Your Teeth and disbandment (2020–2022)
In October 2020, it was announced that in addition to being signed to Greyscale Records, Stuck Out were added to SharpTone Records for international releases. On 27 October, they also released their latest single, "Mindless" featuring Yours Truly vocalist, Mikaila Delgado. Following this was the reveal of their then-upcoming sophomore EP, Lie Through Your Teeth, The first EP to be released jointly by Greyscale and SharpTone. Lie Through Your Teeth was then released successfully on 18 December.

In May 2021, the band played three shows with Yours Truly for their Self Care album tour. A promotional tour for their December-released EP Lie Through Your Teeth was announced for August to November dates, but due to the then-recent COVID-19 variant outbreak, all of their shows were cancelled. No future dates were made, and all tickets were refunded.

Stuck Out released their last ever single "Split in Two" alongside an accompanying music video on 22 March 2022, after announcing their final show and eventual disbandment.

Musical style
Kel Burch of Depth Magazine described their debut EP You Won't Come Home as "precious snapshot of emotional vulnerability" with the lyrics of the songs telling a story of love and loss. Max Jacobson of Hysteria Mag described their sound as being "backed by thick production, gruff vocals and warm guitar tones, with a bit of dirt on them to keep things from sounding too clean". Similarly vocalist Josh Walker's delivery was described as "gruff-yet-melodic". Their sound had been likened to Knuckle Puck and The Story So Far.

Members
Current
 Josh Walker - vocals ; bass 
 Ian Browney - lead guitar, backing vocals 
 Sheldon Schuyler - bass guitar 
 Lachy Lydiard - drums 

Former
 Jackson Cairnduff - bass guitar 
 Bren Dugan - rhythm guitar

Timeline

Discography

Extended plays

Singles

Music videos

References

2015 establishments in Australia
2022 disestablishments in Australia
Australian alternative rock groups
Musical groups established in 2015
Musical groups disestablished in 2022
Musical groups from Melbourne
Musical quintets
Musical quartets